The South London Press, London Weekly News and Mercury (formerly South London Press) is a weekly newspaper currently based in Catford, South London. The newspaper covers the latest news, sports and features within the south, central and west London area.

First published in 1865 by James Henderson, the newspaper is now published every Friday in digital and print format .

The South London Press, London Weekly News and Mercury champions giving London a strong voice to diverse and vibrant communities. This has been achieved through a history of campaigning and putting the spotlight on the issues that really matter.

Former newspaper Mercury (established 1833) and the recent London Weekly News have been incorporated into the South London Press to give overall coverage of London's local issues and offering a true community feel.

Many of its former reporters have gone on to make careers in Fleet Street, and it is still considered a training ground for the nationals. Max Wall and then Richard Woolveridge edited the bi-weekly in its glory days when its circulation was over 130,000.

The novelist and critic Martyn Bedford used to work in the Lewisham office of the paper, while Brian Alexander, the former sports editor of The Sun and Mail on Sunday, was sports editor until 1986. Paul McCarthy, sports editor of the News of the World, John Pienaar, political correspondent and reporter on BBC Radio 5 Live, and David Bond, who was appointed as the BBC's sports editor in 2010, worked at the SLP in the 1980s and 1990s. Others who went on to Fleet Street include Ken Reynolds, Steve Grimes, George Binyon, Willie Robertson, John Twomey, Ian Malin, Debbie Andalo, Brian Stater, Ev Bramble, Carolyn Jones, Anna Pukas, JJ Young, Jonathan Buckmaster, Chris Ward, Stewart Morris, Claire Aaron, Anton La Guardia, Brian McConnell, Peter Burden, Ron Ricketts, Geoff Manners, John Rodda and Colin Wood. Publicist Max Clifford was also an employee.

The South London Press won the Press Gazette Regional Press Awards 2009 Newspaper of the Year for weekly newspapers above 20,000 circulation.

The South London Press incorporates former newspapers, South London News and South London Observer, and the South London Advertiser Group.

In 2017 the newspaper entered a 'media partnership' with Millwall F.C.

Between 2007 and 2016 the paper was part of the Tindle Group, which bought it from Trinity Mirror. The paper was then purchased between 2017-2019 by Street Runners Ltd. 

The South London Press, London Weekly News and Mercury newspaper is now registered under the new company name MSI Media Limited as of 2 March 2020. 

After several moves the South London Press is now based in Bromley Road, Catford where the editorial, advertising and pre-press departments are now all based.

See also
 List of newspapers in London

References

External links
 South London Press website

London newspapers
Newspapers published in London
Publications established in 1865
1865 establishments in England